Terence Kilbourne Hopkins (1928 – January 3, 1997) was an American historical sociologist who collaborated with Immanuel Wallerstein, Giovanni Arrighi and others on world systems theory. Amongst world systems scholars, he was "considered the specialist [...] on all methodological questions".

Life
Hopkins gained a PhD in sociology in Columbia University, where he taught from 1958 to 1968. From 1968 to 1970, he was visiting professor at the University of the West Indies in Trinidad. In 1970, he founded a graduate program in sociology at Binghamton University and taught there until retirement in 1995. He helped found the Fernand Braudel Center at Binghamton. On the occasion of his retirement his students came from all over the world to hold a celebration conference; it was published as Mentoring, Methods, and Movements, highlighting his central contributions.

Works
The Exercise of Influence in Small Groups, 1964
(ed. with Immanuel Wallerstein) Processes of the World-system, 1979
(with Immanuel Wallerstein) World-systems Analysis: Theory and Methodology, 1982
(ed. with Immanuel Wallerstein) The Age of Transition: Trajectory of the World-system 1945–2025, 1996

References

1928 births
1997 deaths
American sociologists
World system scholars
Columbia Graduate School of Arts and Sciences alumni
American expatriates in Trinidad and Tobago
Binghamton University faculty